Josselin Ouanna was the defending champion, but retired in the second round match against Stefano Galvani while scores were 6–7(1–7), 7–6(7–4).
Alejandro Falla won this tournament, by defeating Thierry Ascione 6–3, 6–2 in the final.

Seeds

Draw

Finals

Top half

Bottom half

References
 Main Draw
 Qualifying Draw

Open de Rennes - Singles
2009 Singles